The 1988-89 Welsh Cup winners were Swansea City. The final was played at the Vetch Field in Swansea in front of an attendance of 5,100.

Semi-finals – first Lleg

Semi-finals – second leg

Final

External links
Details of final

1988-89
Wales
Cup
Swansea City A.F.C. matches